The World War II Soviet submarine L-22 belonged to the L-class or Leninets class of minelayer submarines. She was part of the last series (Group 4) of her class, having some improvements including more torpedo tubes. For the successes during the war the boat was awarded the Order of Red Banner.

Service history
L-22 scored her success mostly as a minelayer submarine.

References 

1939 ships
Ships built in the Soviet Union
Leninets-class submarines
World War II submarines of the Soviet Union